George Adams may refer to:

Arts
 George Gammon Adams (1821–1898), English portrait sculptor and medallist
 George G. Adams (architect) (1850–1932), American architect from Lawrence, Massachusetts
 George Adams (musician) (1940–1992), American jazz musician

Politics
 George Adams (1731–1789), British Whig politician and Staffordshire landowner
 George Adams (judge) (1784–1844), American lawyer and political figure in Kentucky and Mississippi
 George Willison Adams (1799–1879), abolitionist and member of the Ohio General Assembly
 George Washington Adams (1801–1829), eldest son of John Quincy Adams
 George Adams (magistrate) (1804–1873), Magistrate of the Pitcairn Islands, 1848
 George Madison Adams (1837–1920), U.S. Representative from Kentucky
 George E. Adams (1840–1917), U.S. Representative from Illinois
 George B. Adams (1845–1911), U.S. lawyer and federal judge
 George H. Adams (1851–1911), American Republican politician and lawyer

Science and academia
 George Adams (scientist, died 1773) (c. 1709–1773), English instrument maker and scientific writer
 George Adams (scientist, died 1795) (1750–1795), his son, English instrument maker and scientific writer
 George Adams (translator) (1698–1768), English translator of Sophocles
 George Burton Adams (1851–1925), American medievalist historian at Yale University
 George Rollie Adams, American educator and historian
 George W. Adams (academic) (1905–1981), Chairman of Commission on Extension Courses and Director of the University Extension at Harvard University

Sports
 George Adams (American football) (born 1962), former American football running back
 George Adams (baseball) (1855–1920), American baseball player for the 1879 Syracuse Stars
 George Adams (basketball) (born 1949), retired American basketball player
 George Adams (footballer, born 1926) (1926–2011), Scottish football player (Leyton Orient)
 George Adams (footballer, born 1947), English football player (Peterborough United)
 George Adams (footballer, born 1950), Scottish football player and coach (director of football at Ross County)
 George C. Adams (1863–1900), head coach of the Harvard University football program

Others
 George J. Adams (1811–1880), leader of a schismatic Latter Day Saint sect who led an ill-fated effort to establish a colony of Americans in Palestine
 George James Adams, 19th century textile manufacturer and abolitionist
 George Adams (businessman) (1839–1904), Australian publican and lottery promoter, founder of Tattersall's
 George Matthew Adams (1878–1962), newspaper columnist and founder of the George Matthew Adams Newspaper Service
 George G. Adams (engineer) (born 1947), American mechanical engineer

See also
 Adams George Archibald (1814–1892), Canadian lawyer and politician
 George Adam (born 1969), Scottish politician
 George Adams Post (1854–1925), Democratic member of the U.S. House of Representatives from Pennsylvania
 Adams (surname)